
The Avia BH-19 was a fighter aircraft built in Czechoslovakia in 1924. It was a low-wing braced monoplane derived from the Avia BH-3 and reflected its designers' ongoing belief that the monoplane configuration was the most suitable for a fighter aircraft. Initial trials revealed excellent performance, but also displayed control problems and aileron flutter. Nevertheless, the Czechoslovakian Army was sufficiently impressed to inform Avia that it would order the BH-19 if the problems could be rectified. The first prototype was destroyed in a crash during speed trials, and the second prototype revealed no better handling than its predecessor. At this point, the Czechoslovakian War Ministry stepped in and asked Avia to cease its attempts to develop a monoplane fighter.

Specifications

See also

References

 
 
 Němeček, V. (1968). Československá letadla. Praha: Naše Vojsko.

1920s Czechoslovakian fighter aircraft
BH-19
Low-wing aircraft
Single-engined tractor aircraft
Aircraft first flown in 1924